Rockford is an unincorporated community in Rockcreek Township, Wells County, in the U.S. state of Indiana.

Geography

References

Unincorporated communities in Wells County, Indiana
Unincorporated communities in Indiana
Fort Wayne, IN Metropolitan Statistical Area